is a fictional character from Gege Akutami's manga Jujutsu Kaisen. He was first introduced in Akutami's short series Tokyo Metropolitan Curse Technical School as the mentor of the cursed teenager Yuta Okkotsu at Tokyo Prefectural Jujutsu High School. This miniseries became the prequel Jujutsu Kaisen 0 of Jujutsu Kaisen. In Jujutsu Kaisen, Gojo takes the same role but mentors the student Yuji Itadori who suffers a similar curse, helping him become stronger, while protecting other characters in the series.

Gege Akutami created Gojo to be a strong, but likable, character who is keen of his students. He is voiced by Yūichi Nakamura in Japanese and Kaiji Tang in English in the animated adaptations by MAPPA.

The character was well received by the media for his carefree nature and power shown when protecting his students. Furthermore, his role in the prequel Jujutsu Kaisen 0 was appreciated by the media due to his hidden depths such as his loving relationship with the antagonist Suguru Geto.

Creation and conception
Gege Akutami created Satoru Gojo with the idea of being one of the strongest characters in the entire series but at the same time being easy to understand to the readers. One of Gojo's keys ideas for his design is a blindfold he wears in his eyes, he can still see thanks to his supernatural powers. His eyes, the 6 Eyes, were primarily used to encounter Curses. In his debut in Jujutsu Kaisen 0, Akutami linked Gojo and Yuta Okkotsu to Michizane Sugawara, a famous figure in Japanese history, in order to explain from whom both characters inherited their supernatural powers. This was done as a tribute to his late editor, Yamanaka. Gojo's design is meant to be the one of a handsome man, often called bishonen while his facial design was inspired by a minor Naruto character whose face was covered in bandages. Despite such looks, Akutami feels unable to write Gojo in a romantic relationship with a woman due to the work of being faithful towards her. In regards to Gojo's relationship with his students, most notably Yuji Itadori and Yuta Okkotsu, Akutami wrote their relationship simply as he claims Gojo only wants troublemakers to become strong. In Japan, it is common for people to call each other through their last names rather than their given names. However, Gojo calls each of his students by their first names. Akutami said he made this decision because he sees Gojo does not have proper consideration for such social traditions.

Sunghoo Park, who directed the first season of the series' anime adaptation as well as the new prequel movie, said adapting one of Gojo's early scenes involving the Domain Expansion scene in the season was a particularly tough one to get just right. Nevertheless, he saw such sequence as memorable. Since the original scene was black and white, Park and his team consulted Akutami in guidance about how should the colors from Gojo's Domain Expansion should be. In regards to the animated movie, Park stated that while "The highlight of the movie is of course, the story of Okkotsu and Rika as the main characters of Jujutsu Kaisen 0" while at the same time wanted to focus on more characters from the manga, most notably the past relationship between Gojo and Geto, explored briefly in the original manga. Seko was requested by the direactor to feature a new fight scene between Gojo and Miguel in the climax.

Casting

Yuichi Nakamura voices the character Satoru Gojo in the original Japanese series. From serious scenes to comical gag scenes, the character has different facial expressions, but since he played without restrictions on the swing range between on and off, Nakamura reiterated at the recording site that he enjoyed gags. The actor did not find a change in Gojo's characterization, finding his mentoring of Yuta similar to the other protagonists from the main Jujutsu Kaisen series. He enjoyed the multiple recordings he had as well as the many school-like relationships. He was impressed by Megumi Ogata's work as Yuta for providing him a large range of emotions.

Kaiji Tang voices the character in English. Tang described him as "the trolliest trolls to ever troll anime." The actor noted that the character stands out due to his whimsical nature and how he interacts with his students. He was also praised for how likable he comes across due to the kind nature he portrays in series with a dark narrative while also showing interesting supernatural powers that are hard to match. Tang still noted that Gojo's arrogance was his only weak point, which also makes him come across as more human as he shows that he can also commit mistakes.

In another interview, Tang compared Gojo to the comic book character Clark Kent based and believed the charm behind the character was that despite his age, Gojo acts like a spoiled child. Before dubbing Gojo, Tang had not read the Jujutsu Kaisen manga but had heard of it. When being cast, Tang did research by reading the manga. When first interacting with Yuji Itadori, Gojo is noted to see a rarely explored darker side of his personality due to how he thinks of the idea of killing a cursed teenager which leads him to see more arrogance in Gojo. In contrast to his previous works like Gearless Joe from Megalobox or Archer from Fate/stay night, Tang feels that Gojo looks at the world in a more childish way than his previous characters as, while Gojo has seen several challenges in his past, none of them made a major impact on him.

Appearances

Jujutsu Kaisen 0
A sorcerer working as a teacher in the Tokyo Prefectural Jujutsu High School. He uses his curse power to control the space around him in innumerable ways. Even though his title of 'The Strongest' is self-proclaimed, most allies and enemies alike never actually dispute the title and generally consider him to be one of the most dangerous people alive. Gojo is introduced in Jujutsu Kaisen 0 a jujutsu sorcerer, in the guidance of the young Yuta Okkotsu whom he convinces to join the Tokyo Metropolitan Curse Technical School in order to control Rika and avoid his solicitude. During this time, Gojo makes Okkotsu train with Panda, Maki Zenin, and Toge Inumaki to help Okkotsu control his own curse while helping him develop friendships. Okkotsu's curse attracts Suguru Geto, a sorcerer friendly with Gojo but at the same time keeps an antagonistic relationship with him. Geto wishes to create a shaman only world. When Okkotsu's curse gives him the power to take down Geto, Gojo appears and kills Geto. He then helps the young Okkotsu to understand the true nature of his powers.

Jujutsu Kaisen
On the day of the Kyoto Goodwill Event, Gojo meets up with the other faculty to watch the event. As the event starts, Gojo watches it through monitors with the other faculties. When intruders invade the site, Gojo heads over to the site along with Utahime and Yoshinobu. He decides to handle Juzo first, and easily manages to restrain him. Gojo then uses a Hollow Purple technique on Hanami, but they cannot tell for sure if he is killed. As a result, Satoru is widely respected by sorcerers and holds high influence in the sorcery world. He convinces his superiors at the college to keep Yuji Itadori alive until he consumes all of Sukuna's fingers. He teaches Yuji, Megumi Fushiguro, and Nobara Kugisaki. He was ambushed by the Special Grade Cursed Spirits at Shibuya, and Kenjaku manages to seal him away in the Prison Realm, after he exorcised Hanami. Nevertheless, Gojo has Okkotsu to take the favor of protecting Yuji from being executed should something bad happen to him.

Reception

Popularity
Satoru Gojo was well received by the series' readers and critics. In a Viz Media popularity poll taken in March 2021, he was voted the most popular character in the franchise. At the 5th Crunchyroll Anime Awards, Gojo was a nominee for best male character, while his fight against Ryomen Sukuna was noted to be best of the year. Yuichi Nakamura's performance as Gojo was also noted to be one of the best ones. In promoting the movie Jujutsu Kaisen 0, advertisements with Gojo as a dog were made alongside SoftBank Group. In December 2021, Mappa and Shueisha also celebrated Gojo's birthday with PulpFiction Cine finding him as one of the most popular characters from the series while also promoting the movie. In a poll from 2021 by LINE Research, Gojo took the first spot in regards to Jujutsu Kaisen characters. He was also third in the best male character award from Animage 2021 Anime Grand Prix poll behind yuta and Tengen Uzui from Demon Slayer: Kimetsu no Yaiba.

Critical response

Comic Book Resources regarded Gojo was the 9th most mature characters in the series despite his childish personality which is why they found the character highly lovable within the manga's readers. In another article, the same site regarded him as one of the series' most dangerous members due to his over-the-top powers that cannot be rivaled by anyone else in the manga. IGN also called Gojo as a fan-favorite character due to the focus of his personality. StudyBreak also noted that Gojo's flamboyant personality often comes across fitting comic relief, citing how he reacts to Fushiguro being hit by a woman as well as how impressive is he shown to be in combat to a major threat.

Despite comparing him to other mentor characters like Kakashi Hatake, All Might or Aizawa, Bleeding Cool said Gojo remains as more likable within this archetype as a result of how "The character is truly a balance of caring coldness with power that keeps dismissing any serious threats", particularly for how caring he is to his students and the might he shows in battle sequences. An article about the character's best ten fight scenes was also written by Comic Book Resources with his fight against Jogo, being not only the best rated fight he has been involved, but also the series' best fight. Like Comic Book Resources, Anime News Network praised the fight scene Gojo has against Jogo for the handling of visuals, finding it far superior than the studio's previous work The God of High School referred by the staff as "irredeemable trash" not only due to the narrative but also pacing in handling Gojo's fight sequence, making the anime adaptation of Jujutsu Kaisen develop its potential in the process. While still finding Gojo as an archetype due to the overpowered he is portrayed as, the reviewer still found him enjoyable personality-wise.

The Mary Sue found Gojo's characterization in Jujutsu Kaisen 0 identical to the main series as a result of how he trains the students but still found the pilot helped to further explore his past as a result of his tragic relationship with Geto. Otaquest also noted the similarities as well as how important is the relationship between Gojo and Geto which ends in a way that surprised the main series' readers. Manga News looked forward to more focus about the relationship between Gojo and Geto. Crunchyroll listed Gojo's higher screen time in the animated film adaptation of the manga, citing him as a  fan favorite character people would appreciate to see. The character's connection with the late Sugawara no Michizane was kept vague that might generate a future impact in the series by critics.

References

Anime and manga characters who can move at superhuman speeds
Anime and manga characters who can teleport
Anime and manga characters who use magic
Anime and manga characters with superhuman strength
Comics characters introduced in 2017
Fictional Japanese people in anime and manga
Fictional characters with dimensional travel abilities
Fictional characters with energy-manipulation abilities
Fictional characters with gravity abilities
Fictional characters with healing abilities
Fictional demon hunters
Fictional exorcists
Fictional ghost hunters
Fictional male martial artists
Fictional schoolteachers
Male characters in anime and manga
Martial artist characters in anime and manga